John Cox (6 August 1823 – 30 November 1866) was an Australian cricket player, who played first class cricket for Tasmania and Victoria.

See also
 List of Tasmanian representative cricketers

References

External links
Cricinfo profile

Australian cricketers
Tasmania cricketers
Victoria cricketers
1823 births
1866 deaths
Australian emigrants to New Zealand
Cricketers from Tasmania